Dobrotești is a commune in Dolj County, Oltenia, Romania with a population of 3,288 people. It is composed of two villages, Dobrotești and Nisipuri. These were part of Amărăștii de Sus Commune until 2004, when they were split off.

References

Communes in Dolj County
Localities in Oltenia